The Journal of Applied Mathematics and Mechanics, also known as Zeitschrift für Angewandte Mathematik und Mechanik or ZAMM is a monthly peer-reviewed scientific journal dedicated to applied mathematics. It is published by Wiley-VCH on behalf of the Gesellschaft für Angewandte Mathematik und Mechanik. The editor-in-chief is Holm Altenbach (Otto von Guericke University Magdeburg). According to the Journal Citation Reports, the journal has a 2021 impact factor of 1.759.

Publication history
The journal's first issue appeared in 1921, published by the Verein Deutscher Ingenieure and edited by Richard von Mises.

References

External links

Mathematics journals
Monthly journals
Wiley-VCH academic journals
English-language journals